Virginia's 26th Senate district is one of 40 districts in the Senate of Virginia. It has been represented by Republican Mark Obenshain since 2004, succeeding fellow Republican Kevin Miller.

Geography
District 26 is located in the upper Shenandoah Valley, covering Page County, Rappahannock County, Shenandoah County, Warren County, the City of Harrisonburg, and part of Rockingham County.

The district overlaps with Virginia's 5th and 6th congressional districts, and with the 15th, 18th, 25th, 26th, and 29th districts of the Virginia House of Delegates. It borders the state of West Virginia.

Recent election results

2019

2015

2011

Federal and statewide results in District 26

Historical results
All election results below took place prior to 2011 redistricting, and thus were under different district lines.

2007

2003

1999

1995

References

Virginia Senate districts
Harrisonburg, Virginia
Page County, Virginia
Rappahannock County, Virginia
Shenandoah County, Virginia
Warren County, Virginia
Rockingham County, Virginia